George Manning may refer to:

 George Manning (died 1849), British murderer, the husband and accomplice of Marie Manning
 George Manning (New Zealand politician) (1887–1976), Mayor of Christchurch, New Zealand
 George T. Manning (1908–1956), New York politician

See also
 George Manning McDade (1893–1966), Canadian politician
 Gwyn Manning (1915–2003), Welsh footballer who played at the 1948 Summer Olympics, sometimes mistakenly listed as George Manning